Events in the year 1991 in Burkina Faso.

Incumbents 

 President: Blaise Compaoré

Events 

 1 December – Presidential elections were held in the country.

Deaths

References 

 
1990s in Burkina Faso
Years of the 20th century in Burkina Faso
Burkina Faso
Burkina Faso